is a Japanese manga artist from Hokkaido. His first professional work was the short manga Black City, published in the autumn 1992 Shonen Jump special edition, which received Weekly Shōnen Jump Hop Step Award for rookie artists. Several of his manga were serialized in Weekly Shōnen Jump including Pretty Face and M×0. Pretty Face was published in North America by Viz Media.

Works

Serialized manga
Pretty Face serialized in Weekly Shōnen Jump (2002–2003), 6 volumes
M×0 serialized in Weekly Shōnen Jump (2006–2008), 10 volumes
 serialized in Weekly Shōnen Jump (2011–2012), 3 volumes 
Kiss x Death serialized in Shōnen Jump+ (2014–2018), 7 volumes
Kiruru Kill Me serialized in  Shōnen Jump+ (2020–present), 2 volumes

Short works
Black City (1996) - collection of previously published stories
Black City (1992)
 (1993)
Proto One (1995)
Jewel of Love (1996)
Tokyo Ants (2003) - collection of previously published stories
Snow in the Dark (2007) - collection of previously published stories
 (2004)
She Monkey (2004)
Snow in the Dark (2004)
MP0 (2005), (Prototype version of M×0)
 (2008)
 (2009)
Loop (L∞P) (2009)
Ghost Jim (2010)
Brand New School Day (2013)
 (2013)
 (2014)

Illustrations
Midnight Magic, novel series in Japan's Jump Novel magazine (1993-2001)

References

External links

1970 births
Living people
Manga artists from Hokkaido